Sima Humboldt (Sima Mayor) is an enormous sinkhole located on the summit of the plateau of Sarisariñama tepui in Bolívar State, Venezuela. It is unusual for several reasons, including its enormous size and depth, its location on the top of the only forested tepui, having a patch of forest on its base and also due to the weathering process that formed this sinkhole. The feature is named after scientist and explorer Alexander von Humboldt.

Together with the neighbouring Sima Martel, it was first spotted in 1961 by pilot Harry Gibson.

The sinkhole was descended for the first time in 1974 and more thoroughly explored in 1976.

Only 700 metres from the rim of Sima Humboldt there is another enormous sinkhole, Sima Martel. In total there are four caves on Sarisariñama.

References 

Quartzite caves
Geography of Bolívar (state)
Caves of Venezuela
Sinkholes of South America